Pesti Napló was a Hungarian newspaper published from March 1850 to October 1939. The paper was based in Budapest, Hungary. 

The Hungarian author Zsigmond Kemény was among the regular contributors to another paper, Pesti Hírlap. He became the editor of Pesti Napló in 1855.

References

1850 establishments in Hungary
1939 disestablishments in Hungary
Defunct newspapers published in Hungary
Hungarian-language newspapers
Newspapers published in Budapest
Publications established in 1850
Publications disestablished in 1939